Karny or Kárný is a surname. Notable people with the surname include:

 Heinrich Hugo Karny (1886–1939), Austrian entomologist
 Miroslav Kárný (1919–2001), Czech historian

See also